Patrik Fahlgren (born 27 June 1985) is a Swedish handball coach and former player.

References

1985 births
Living people
Swedish male handball players
Handball players from Gothenburg
MT Melsungen players